is a Japanese professional boxer who is a former WBA super flyweight champion. He is an alumnus of the Tokyo University of Agriculture.

Biography
Shimizu had an amateur record of 68–10 (25 KOs). He turned to professional and made his debut in March 2004. He is managed by Kentarō Kaneko's Kaneko Boxing Gym and trained under Kenji Kaneko's guidance.

In April 2007, Shimizu lost to Pongsaklek Wonjongkam in the WBC flyweight championship in Sara Buri, Thailand. Then he captured the Japanese flyweight title in April 2008. After losing his second world title shot against Daisuke Naito at the Yoyogi National Stadium First Gymnasium in Tokyo, Japan, in July of that year, he defeated the interim champion Toshiyuki Igarashi in the Japanese title unification match and defended that title three more times.

WBA super flyweight title
Shimizu moved up in weight division and won the WBA super flyweight title with a split decision over Hugo Cázares at the Nippon Budokan in Tokyo, on August 31, 2011. It was presented by Kameda Promotions. At first, WBA's Gilberto Mendoza did not approve this fight. However it was authorized at the last minute. He suffered a fracture of the right orbital floor in that fight. Although it took three months to recover, the prospects for recovery were clear, and Shimizu had started training for the first defense that would take place in around March 2012. Nevertheless, the JBC (Japan Boxing Commission) indefinitely-suspended second Shirō Kameda, and identically the JBC indefinitely-suspended promoter Noriyuki Igarashi (both from Kameda Promotions) requested that the scheduled interim WBA super flyweight title match Tepparith Kokietgym vs. Daiki Kameda would be elevated to the regular title bout at the WBA Championship Committee in Donetsk, Ukraine. As a result of that, Shimizu was designated as a champion in recess on November 10, 2011.

Shimizu who has recovered from injury enough to do his usual training including sparring, and his manager Kaneko held a press conference on 29 November. Shimizu stated that he would fight against anyone as a champion. The team Shimizu strongly demanded a retraction and complained that the bout between Tepparith and Kameda should be taken place as an intern championship or a title eliminator. Kaneko Boxing Gym submitted a questionnaire with the December 5 deadline to the JBC. The team Shimizu mentioned that they would give up the title, if they can not get a coherent answer. The WBA's decision to make Shimizu a champion in recess has been controversial in Japan, and it has been continuously reported in the major media such as three major newspapers. Although Kaneko Boxing Gym were given the almost zero response from the JBC, as the maximum concession, they barely accepted the status quo on condition that the unification match is early implemented.

Shimizu fought against Tepparith Kokietgym in the WBA super flyweight unification bout at the Yokohama Arena on April 4, 2012. It was staged again by Kameda Promotions who had also had the exclusive promotional rights for the future title defense ahead of Simizu. Shimizu lost there via a ninth round stoppage. After the fight, Shimizu mentioned that he would not waste the last six months where he grew both as a boxer and as a person.

Professional boxing record

See also 
List of WBA world champions
List of super-flyweight boxing champions
List of Japanese boxing world champions
Boxing in Japan

Notes

References

External links 

|-

1981 births
Living people
Super-flyweight boxers
World Boxing Association champions
World super-flyweight boxing champions
World boxing champions
People from Fukui (city)
Sportspeople from Fukui Prefecture
Japanese male boxers
Japanese sportsperson-politicians